The TF postcode area, also known as the Telford postcode area, is a group of thirteen postcode districts in England, within six post towns. These cover north-east Shropshire, including Telford, Broseley, Market Drayton, Much Wenlock, Newport and Shifnal, plus a small part of west Staffordshire.



Coverage
The approximate coverage of the postcode districts:

|-
! TF1
| TELFORD
| Wellington, Leegomery, Hadley, Ketley, Arleston, Hortonwood
| Telford & Wrekin
|-
! TF2
| TELFORD
| Oakengates, Priorslee, St. Georges, Donnington, Wrockwardine Wood, Muxton
| Telford & Wrekin
|-
! TF3
| TELFORD
| Telford Town Centre and Park, Hollinswood, Randlay, Stirchley, Brookside, Stafford Park
| Telford & Wrekin
|-
! TF4
| TELFORD
| Dawley, Malinslee, Lawley, Horsehay
| Telford & Wrekin
|-
! TF5
| TELFORD
| Admaston, Bratton, Shawbirch
| Telford & Wrekin
|-
! TF6
| TELFORD
| The Wrekin, Wrockwardine, Longden-upon-Tern, High Ercall
| Telford & Wrekin
|-
! TF7
| TELFORD
| Madeley, Woodside, Sutton Hill, Halesfield
| Telford & Wrekin
|-
! TF8
| TELFORD
| Ironbridge, Coalbrookdale, Coalport, Jackfield
| Telford & Wrekin
|-
! TF9
| MARKET DRAYTON
| Market Drayton, Loggerheads, Hodnet, Ternhill
| Shropshire, Newcastle-under-Lyme
|-
! TF10
| NEWPORT
| Newport, Lilleshall, Edgmond, Moreton, Great Chatwell, Orslow
| Telford & Wrekin, Stafford, South Staffordshire
|-
! TF11
| SHIFNAL
| Shifnal, Tong, Weston-under-Lizard
| Shropshire, South Staffordshire
|-
! TF12
| BROSELEY
| Broseley
| Shropshire
|-
! TF13
| MUCH WENLOCK
| Much Wenlock
| Shropshire
|}

Map

See also
Postcode Address File
List of postcode areas in the United Kingdom

References

External links
Royal Mail's Postcode Address File
A quick introduction to Royal Mail's Postcode Address File (PAF)
Using Welsh alternative addresses within Royal Mail's Postcode Address File (PAF)

Postcode areas covering the West Midlands (region)
Shropshire
Telford and Wrekin